Hood Brothers Building, also known as Hood's Corner, is a historic commercial building located at Smithfield, Johnston County, North Carolina.  It was built in 1923, and is a two-story, five bay by six bay, rectangular steel frame building with a brick veneer in the Classical Revival style.  The building incorporates two storefronts; the second and third floors were occupied by offices. The storefronts were for many years occupied by a drug store and barber shop.

It was listed on the National Register of Historic Places in 1986.  It is located in the Downtown Smithfield Historic District.

References

Buildings and structures in Smithfield, North Carolina
Commercial buildings completed in 1923
Commercial buildings on the National Register of Historic Places in North Carolina
Historic district contributing properties in North Carolina
National Register of Historic Places in Johnston County, North Carolina
Neoclassical architecture in North Carolina